Conospermum floribundum is a shrub endemic to Western Australia.

It blooms between September and December producing white flowers.

It is found in the southern Wheatbelt, Great Southern and Goldfields-Esperance regions of Western Australia where it grows in sandy gravelly soils.

References

External links

Eudicots of Western Australia
floribundum
Endemic flora of Western Australia
Plants described in 1870